Tammy is a feminine given name. It can be a short form of the names Tamsin, Thomasina, or Tamar, Tamara or Tabitha. Tamsin and Thomasina are feminine versions of the name Thomas, a Greek form of the Aramaic name Te'oma, meaning twin. Tamara is a Russian form of the Hebrew name Tamar, which means "palm tree". In Israel "Tami" (תמי) is commonly used as an abbreviation of the original Hebrew name.

The name was popularized by a film series from the 1950s and 1960s about a lovable backwoods girl named Tammy Tyree.

Tammy was most popular as a feminine given name in the United States in the 1950s, when it was the 140th most popular name given to girls; in the 1960s, when it was the 13th most popular name for girls; and in the 1970s, when it was the 23rd most popular name for girls. It remained well-used throughout the 1980s and into the mid-1990s. It has not been ranked among the top 1,000 names for girls born in the United States since 1998. It was the 75th most common name for all women in the United States in the 1990 census. It was ranked as the 959th most popular name for boys born between 1960 and 1969 in the United States, but has not appeared among the top 1,000 names for boys there since the 1960s.

People
Tammy Abraham (born 1997), English footballer 
Tammy Ader, American television writer, director and producer
Tammy Alexander, American homicide victim found in the town of Caledonia, New York, on November 10, 1979
Tammy Armstrong (born 1974), Canadian poet and novelist
Tammy Baldwin (born 1962), American politician serving as the junior United States senator from Wisconsin
Tammy Barr, American actress, model and voice over artist
Tammy Barton, Australian entrepreneur and the founder of MyBudget
Tammy Beauchamp (1878–1947), born Thomas Beacham, Australian rules footballer
Tammy Beaumont (born 1991), English cricketer
Tammy Beauvais, Indigenous fashion designer from Kahnawake Mohawk Territory, Quebec, Canada
Tammy Blanchard (born 1976), American actress
Tammy Clarkson, Australian television actress
Tammy Cleland (born 1975), American athlete in synchronized swimming 
Tammy Cole (born 1973), Australian female field hockey defender
Tammy Duckworth (born 1968), American politician and former U.S. Army lieutenant colonel who has served as the junior United States senator for Illinois
Tammy Franks (born 1968), Australian politician, member of the South Australian Legislative Council
Tammy Graham (born 1968), American country music artist
Tammy Grimes (1934–2016), American actress and singer
Tammy Homolka (1975–1990), the younger sister and victim of Canadian murderer Karla Homolka and her partner, Paul Bernardo
Tammy Jackson (born 1962), American former college and professional basketball player 
Tammy Jones, stage name of Debbie D'Amato, professional wrestler from the Gorgeous Ladies of Wrestling
Tammy Lau Nga-wun (born 1992), Hong Kong rugby union player
Tammy Leitner (born 1972), American investigative TV reporter and reality television contestant
Tammy Lynn Sytch, (born 1972), American professional wrestling valet, known for her time in the WWF during the mid 1990s as "Sunny"
Tammy MacIntosh (born 1970), Australian actress
Tammy Faye Messner (1942–2007), American Christian singer, evangelist, author, talk show hostess, and television personality
Tammy Ogston (born 1970), Australian football referee
Tammy Pescatelli, American stand-up comedian
Tammy Sutton-Brown (born 1978), Canadian basketball player
Tammy Wynette (1942–1998), American country music singer-songwriter

Fictional characters
Tammy Banks, in the film Tammy
Tammy Swanson (differentiated as Tammy I, Tammy II, and Tammy Zero), three characters in the American television series Parks and Recreation
Tammy Tarleton, in the television series Tammy
Tambrey "Tammy" Tyree, in the Tammy film series
Tammy, in the animated series Rick and Morty
Tammy Larsen, in the animated series Bob's Burgers
Tammy, in the animated series The Ridonculous Race
Reverend Tammy in the comedy show The Middle

Notes

See also
 Tami (given name)
 Tammie

English feminine given names
English given names
Feminine given names